The China Open 9-Ball Championship is a professional nine-ball pool tournament held annually since 2009. The event is held in Shanghai, China.

Format
Events in the China Open are played firstly in a double-elimination tournament, with a race to nine . As soon as only 32 players are left in the tournament the event transitions into a single-elimination tournament and race to 11 racks. In the women's events, the racks are shortened to races to seven and nine respectively.

Prize money 
The winner of the men's tournament receives $40,000, with the total prize money distributed at the men's tournament was different for the individual tournaments. $134,000 was awarded in 2010, $195,200 in 2014. The winner of the women's tournament receives since 2011 $30,000 US dollars, previously it was initially $25,000, then $26,000. Overall, the women's 2014 prize money of $138,000 US dollars was distributed, in 2009, however, only $75,000.

History

Men

Women

References

External links 

Pool competitions
Cue sports leagues
Pool tours and series
Recurring sporting events established in 2009